Showgrounds railway station is located on the Flemington Racecourse line in Victoria, Australia. It serves the Melbourne Showgrounds in the suburb of Flemington. The station opened on 7 November 1883.

The station is only used during special events at the Melbourne Showgrounds, such as the annual Royal Melbourne Show.

Three signal boxes are located at Showgrounds, although the one included in a rostrum on the platform was decommissioned in 2014. There are several portable buildings providing staff amenities, and a wooden station building for selling rail tickets. Also located on the platform are turnstiles for entry to the Melbourne Showgrounds, and a Ticketek booking office for admission tickets to events there.

Platforms and services
Showgrounds has one platform. During special events, it is served by trains to Flinders Street, which stop at North Melbourne and Southern Cross.

Platform 1:
 limited stop services to Southern Cross and/or Flinders Street; services to Flemington Racecourse (special event days only)

Transport links
Yarra Trams runs one route, stopping at the nearby Sandown Road tram stop on Epsom Road.
: West Maribyrnong – Flinders Street station (Elizabeth Street CBD)

References

External links
 Melway map at street-directory.com.au

Railway stations in Melbourne
Railway stations in Australia opened in 1883</ref>
Flemington, Victoria
Railway stations in the City of Melbourne (LGA)